John Garfield "Toby" Bailey (born November 19, 1975) is an American former professional basketball player. He is currently a sports agent.

College career
Bailey played four years of college basketball at UCLA, being part of the Bruins squad that won the 1995 NCAA Men's Division I Basketball Tournament. In the championship game against Arkansas, Bailey scored 26 points and had nine rebounds as a freshman. All of the team's starting lineup – Bailey, Ed O'Bannon, Tyus Edney, George Zidek, and Charles O'Bannon – later played in both the National Basketball Association and overseas. Bailey was a first-team All-Pacific-10 Conference selection in 1996, 1997, and 1998. He was voted co-Most Valuable Player of the Bruins in 1996 and 1998.

Professional career
Bailey was selected by the Los Angeles Lakers in the second round (45th overall) of the 1998 NBA Draft, and played for two seasons with the Phoenix Suns, averaging 3.3 points per game in 73 regular season games.

After his NBA career, and following a brief spell in the ABA, he moved on to Europe, successively representing Fillattice Imola (Italy), Panionios BC, Aris Thessaloniki and AEK Athens (Greece), Telindus Oostende (Belgium), Köln 99ers (Germany), and Ricoh Manresa (Spain). Toby finished out his career playing for EnBW Ludwigsburg in Ludwigsburg, Germany before retiring in 2013.

Sports agent career
In 2012, Bailey and Dean Walle started a small basketball player representation firm, Sky Sports Management. They joined Rival Sports Group in 2014 as vice presidents of basketball, and report to President of Basketball Mitchell Butler, who also played at UCLA.

See also
 1994-95 UCLA Bruins men's basketball team

Notes

References

External links
 
 AEK player profile
 Basketpedya career data

1975 births
Living people
AEK B.C. players
American expatriate basketball people in Belgium
American expatriate basketball people in Germany
American expatriate basketball people in Greece
American expatriate basketball people in Italy
American expatriate basketball people in Spain
American sports agents
Aris B.C. players
Artland Dragons players
Basketball players from Los Angeles
Bàsquet Manresa players
BC Oostende players
Köln 99ers players
Liga ACB players
Los Angeles Lakers draft picks
Panionios B.C. players
Phoenix Suns players
Shooting guards
UCLA Bruins men's basketball players
American men's basketball players